Key Largo is a German-style board game designed by Paul Randles with Mike Selinker and Bruno Faidutti. It was published in 2005 by Tilsit Editions and in 2008 by Paizo Publishing. The game takes place in 1899 in the Key Largo area of Florida, where treasure-hunting companies seek gold and artifacts from shipwrecks before the hurricane season. The players hire divers, buy equipment, and search wrecks throughout the game. The game has a simultaneous action sequence which lets players choose locations for their ships to go twice per day, in the course of a ten-day game sequence.

Though not published by the same companies, in many ways it is a thematic sequel to Randles' game Pirate's Cove.

The cover of the French edition, by artist David Cochard, is a parody of an illustration in The Adventures of Tintin comic Red Rackham's Treasure. Hurricane Katty is named for Randles' widow, Katty Pepermans. The faces on the money are caricatures of Randles, Faidutti, Selinker, Cochard, and game editor Nicolas Anton.

Reviews
Pyramid

Footnotes

External links
Key Largo at Bruno Faidutti's website

Board game sequels
Board games introduced in 2005
Bruno Faidutti games
Mike Selinker games
Paizo Publishing games
Fiction set in 1899
Florida in fiction
Key Largo